Driekes Hoekstra is a folk singer from Breda, Netherlands. On 6 March 2015, he won the finale of the talent show Bloed, Zweet en Tranen ("Blood, Sweat, and Tears") on the Dutch television station SBS6.

References

Living people
Dutch folk singers
Reality show winners
Year of birth missing (living people)